The 2011 Jordan FA Shield was the 30th Jordan FA Shield to be played. All 12 teams of 2011–12 Jordan League played in this competition.

The competition format changed, with the teams divided in two groups, instead of three as in the previous season. Top two teams from each group qualified for the semifinals.

Group stage

Group A

Group B

Semi-finals

Final

Jordan Shield Cup
Shield